The Golden Horseshoe is a secondary region of Southern Ontario, Canada, which lies at the western end of Lake Ontario, with outer boundaries stretching south to Lake Erie and north to Lake Scugog, Lake Simcoe and Georgian Bay of Lake Huron. The region is the most densely populated and industrialized in Canada. Based on the 2021 census, with a population of 7,759,635 people in its core and 9,765,188 in its greater area, the Golden Horseshoe accounts for over 20 percent of the population of Canada and more than 54 percent of Ontario's population. It is part of the Quebec City–Windsor Corridor, itself part of the Great Lakes megalopolis.

The core of the Golden Horseshoe starts from Niagara Falls at the eastern end of the Niagara Peninsula and extends west, wrapping around the western end of Lake Ontario at Hamilton and then turning northeast to Toronto (on the northwestern shore of Lake Ontario), before finally terminating at Clarington in Durham Region. The term Greater Golden Horseshoe is used to describe a broader region that stretches inland from the core to the area of the Trent–Severn Waterway, such as Peterborough, in the northeast, to Barrie and Lake Simcoe in the north, and to the Grand River area, including centres such as Brantford, Waterloo Region, and Guelph to the west. The Greater Golden Horseshoe forms the neck of the Ontario Peninsula.

Etymology

The horseshoe part of the region's name is derived from the characteristic horseshoe shape of the west end of Lake Ontario. The golden part is historically attributed to the region's wealth and prosperity, according to the Canadian Oxford Dictionary.

The phrase Golden Horseshoe was first used by Westinghouse Electric Corporation president Herbert H. Rogge in a speech to the Hamilton Chamber of Commerce on January 12, 1954:

The speech writer who actually penned the phrase was Charles Hunter MacBain, executive assistant to five Westinghouse presidents including Rogge.

Definition
The Golden Horseshoe has been recognised as a geographic region since the 1950s, but it was only on July 13, 2004, that a report from the provincial Ministry of Public Infrastructure Renewal entitled Places to Grow coined the term Greater Golden Horseshoe, extending the boundaries west to Waterloo Region, north to Barrie/Simcoe County, and northeast to the county and city of Peterborough.  A subsequent edition released February 16, 2005, broadened the term further, adding Brant, Haldimand and Northumberland Counties to the now quasi-administrative region. The Greater Golden Horseshoe region is officially designated in Ontario Regulation 416/05 under the Places to Grow Act. The designation Greater Golden Horseshoe has legal significance with respect to taxation: in April 2017, the Government of Ontario announced plans to impose a 15 per cent Non-Resident Speculation Tax (NRST) on non-Canadian citizens, non-permanent residents and non-Canadian corporations (with exceptions or rebates for refugees, qualifying students and certain people working in Ontario) buying residential properties containing one to six units in the Greater Golden Horseshoe (GGH).

The provincial transit authority Metrolinx makes use of the term Greater Golden Horseshoe. The Metrolinx definition is consistent with the original 2004 Places to Grow definition. However, the city and county of Peterborough is not included.

Demographics

Population

Ethnicity 
The Golden Horseshoe is among the most multicultural and diverse regions in Canada. 

As of 2021, Europeans form a plurality with 3,762,090 persons or 49.0 percent of the total population, followed by South Asians with 1,273,525 persons or 16.6 percent and East Asians with 813,015 persons or 10.6 percent.

Economy

The economy of this region is very diverse. The Toronto Stock Exchange is the third-largest in North America by market capitalization (after the New York Stock Exchange and Nasdaq), and seventh-largest in the world. 

Cities including Hamilton, Oshawa, Oakville, Whitby and Kitchener all contain major large-scale industrial production facilities, Hamilton being dominated by the steel industry and Oakville and Oshawa primarily in the automotive industry. Other significant automotive-production facilities also exist in Brampton, and St. Catharines. While manufacturing remains important to the economy of the region, the manufacturing sector has experienced a significant decline since 2000 as a result of unfavourable currency exchange rates, increasing energy costs, and reduced demand from the United States, which is by far the largest market for Ontario's goods.

The Port of Hamilton and the Port of Toronto are the two largest seaports on Lake Ontario. The Welland Canal system handles tanker ship and recreational traffic through the Great Lakes. Large rail and truck distribution facilities are located in Toronto, Vaughan and Brampton. Food processing is also a key ingredient in the economy. 

Niagara Falls has one of the world's largest per-capita tourist economies, benefiting from millions of tourists coming to see its majestic waterfalls, shop in its numerous stores, and visit its many attractions. The winemaking and fruit-growing industries of the Niagara Peninsula produce award-winning wines, which are beginning to attract attention around the world, in particular, the ice wine for which the region is known.

As of 2014, sectors such as information technology, health care, Agtech, tourism, research and finance provide the bulk of growth in the Golden Horseshoe. The cities of Brampton, Markham, Waterloo Region and Mississauga, are emerging as hubs for technology and innovation. The region is one of the largest tech cluster in North America outside of Silicon Valley. The area is home to more than 15,000 tech companies, including 5,000+ startups, and nearly 300,000 employees in high-tech industries. About two-thirds of those employees are classified as “tech workers,” which includes programmers, developers, etc. with 8 percent of the total workforce employed in tech.

Education

The Golden Horseshoe is home to several universities, including the University of Toronto and McMaster University in Hamilton, which are ranked 1st and 4th in Canada, respectively, by the Academic Ranking of World Universities. Other universities in the region include Brock University in St. Catharines, Trent University in Peterborough, York University in northern Toronto near Vaughan, OCAD University in downtown Toronto, Ontario Tech University in Oshawa, Toronto Metropolitan University (formerly Ryerson University), University of Guelph, University of Waterloo, Wilfrid Laurier University in Waterloo, Université de l'Ontario français in downtown Toronto and Lakehead University in Orillia.

Public primary and secondary schooling is typically provided by school boards, largely organized at the municipal or county/regional level. The only school board that operates throughout the Golden Horseshoe is Conseil scolaire Viamonde, a public French-language school board, and Conseil scolaire catholique MonAvenir, a public French-language separate school board. Both of these public French-language school boards operate across the Ontario Peninsula.

Attractions

The CN Tower in Toronto is among the most internationally notable attractions in the Golden Horseshoe.

The region is home to several shopping malls such as Yorkdale Shopping Centre, Toronto Eaton Centre, Fairview Mall, Scarborough Town Centre, and Sherway Gardens. Located in the suburbs of Toronto are Vaughan Mills in Vaughan, Bramalea City Centre in Brampton, Square One Shopping Centre in Mississauga, and Pacific Mall and Markville Shopping Centre in Markham.

Annual cultural festivals that draw tourists and local alike include the Toronto Caribbean Carnival (formerly known as Caribana) and Taste of the Danforth in Toronto.

The Niagara Escarpment, a world biosphere reserve as designated by the United Nations, runs from the north at Bruce Peninsula and then east through the region cutting the Niagara Gorge at Niagara Falls. The Bruce Trail runs along the escarpment through mostly protected woodlands. The Cheltenham Badlands in Caledon is an environmentally degraded area along the Niagara Escarpment. Similar protection of some wooded areas exists on the Oak Ridges Moraine running east–west in the north end of the Greater Toronto Area, although development pressures continue to threaten the natural habitat.

The Niagara Region has become one of the major wine-production areas in Canada. The Golden Horseshoe contains many small towns with historic main streets, most notably the community of Niagara-on-the-Lake, located near the Niagara River. Niagara Falls has one of the world's largest waterfalls and attracts millions to Clifton Hill, a neighbourhood with souvenir stores, small attractions, restaurants and skyline-defining hotels. There are also two casinos: Casino Niagara and Niagara Fallsview Casino Resort.

Hamilton has the historical reputation of being a blue-collar city; however, waterfront redevelopments and large-scale gentrification have been rapidly changing the perception of the city, although it retains a dominant industrial base. Hamilton has over 100 waterfalls and cascades throughout the region.

Seasonal theme parks in the Golden Horseshoe include Canada's Wonderland, run by Cedar Fair in Vaughan; Wet'n'Wild Toronto (formerly Wild Water Kingdom) in Brampton; African Lion Safari in Hamilton and Cambridge; and Marineland in Niagara Falls. Though not a theme park per se, the Exhibition Place hosts the annual Canadian National Exhibition.

Sports

The Golden Horseshoe is home to a number of amateur and professional sports clubs, and university and college varsity programs. Many professional sports clubs in the city form a part of a larger sports league. Most university varsity programs are regulated by U Sports, while college varsity programs are regulated by the Canadian Collegiate Athletic Association. 

In addition to the number of sports clubs and programs based in the region, the Golden Horseshoe has also hosted a number of international multi-sport events, including the 1930 British Empire Games (predecessor to the Commonwealth Games), the 1976 Summer Paralympics, the 2015 Pan American Games and Parapan American Games, the 2017 Invictus Games, the 2017 North American Indigenous Games, and the 2018 NACAC Championships. Although the 1976 Summer Olympics was held in Montreal, several matches for the event's soccer tournament were played in Toronto. Toronto is among various cities in North America to host matches for the 2026 FIFA World Cup.

Note that the Toronto Blue Jays temporarily played their home games in the United States (more specifically Dunedin, Florida and Buffalo, New York) due to the COVID-19 pandemic in North America in 2020 and 2021, while the Toronto Raptors played their home games in the United States (more specifically Tampa, Florida) during the pandemic to minimize cross-border travel.

Transportation

The Golden Horseshoe is served by a network of expressways, the backbone of which are the Queen Elizabeth Way and Highway 401, one of the widest and busiest expressways in the world. Public transit in the region is coordinated by Metrolinx. Regional transit is provided by GO Transit trains and buses, and by intercity bus operators such as Ontario Northland and Coach Canada. GO Transit's train network encompasses seven commuter rail lines linking municipalities in the Golden Horseshoe to Toronto's Union Station, which is the busiest railway station in Canada and the second busiest railway station in North America, with 72 million passengers per year. Expansion is underway to facilitate all-day 15-minute or better commuter train service, electrification and increased ridership on five of the busiest lines. Local transit is provided by municipal agencies, the largest of which is the Toronto Transit Commission, which operates three subway lines and one light metro line and an extensive bus and streetcar network. Rapid transit systems outside Toronto include the VIVA bus rapid transit in York Region, the ION light rail system in Kitchener-Waterloo, and the Mississauga transitway. Line 5 and Line 6 are under construction LRT lines in Toronto that are part of its subway system. The Hurontario LRT is currently under construction in Peel Region, as well as various bus rapid transit projects in Peel and York Regions.

The primary airport of the region is Toronto Pearson International Airport (officially Lester B. Pearson International Airport), located in Mississauga. Handling 49.5 million passengers in 2018, it is the busiest in Canada and the 31st busiest in the world. Other regional airports of significance include John C. Munro Hamilton International Airport located in southern Hamilton, which is a major regional freight and courier location as well as the Region of Waterloo International Airport in Kitchener; Buttonville Airport and Billy Bishop airport in the Greater Toronto Area. Within driving distance is Buffalo Niagara International Airport in Cheektowaga, New York, in the United States. Buffalo Niagara carries the second largest passenger volume in the region, serving over 5 million passengers in 2018. It is frequently used by Canadian passengers flying to US destinations.

Notes

References

External links

The City Of Waterfalls

 
Metropolitan areas of Ontario
Geographic regions of Ontario
1950s neologisms